Elisabeth Deichmann (June 12,  1896 – August 9, 1975) was a Danish-born American marine biologist.

Life and work
Elisabeth Deichmann was born on 12 June 1896 in Copenhagen, the capital of Denmark. She was appointed as assistant zoologist at the Royal Agricultural College of Copenhagen, working for the zoologist Johan Erik Vesti Boas in 1918 and was awarded her M.Sc. from the University of Copenhagen in 1922 while still working there. Deichmann received a grant to study at Pacific Grove, California in 1924 and worked at the British Museum two years later. She was awarded her Ph.D by Radcliffe College in 1927 and then became assistant zoologist at the United States Bureau of Fisheries the following year. She received an Agassiz Fellowship at the Museum of Comparative Zoology at Harvard University in 1929 and then became assistant curator of invertebrates in 1930. Deichmann was promoted to curator in 1942 and retired in 1961, but retained an emerita post until 1975.

Activities and awards
Deichmann specialized in Echinoderms and corals and discovered several new species herself. She also studied Octocorallia and Holothuria. She was awarded King Christian X's Liberty Medal in 1946 by the Danish Government and later became a Knight of the Order of the Dannebrog for her contributions to zoology and Danish culture.

Notes

References

1896 births
University of Copenhagen alumni
Danish marine biologists
Radcliffe College alumni
Year of death missing
Danish emigrants to the United States